

Plants

Pteridophytes

Angiosperms

Fish

Ray-finned fish

Archosauromorphs

Newly named dinosaurs
Data courtesy of George Olshevsky's dinosaur genera list.

Birds

Some remarks on newly named birds

 Hulsanpes perlei Osmolska, 1982 was described as a Troodontidae, it is sometimes seen as an Avialae because of having a ginglymoid metatarsal II.

Newly named birds

Plesiosaurs

New taxa

Pterosaurs

New taxa

Crocodylomorpha

New taxa

References

 
Paleontology
Paleontology 2